The 23rd District of the Iowa House of Representatives in the state of Iowa.

Current elected officials
David Sieck is the representative currently representing the district.

Past representatives
The district has previously been represented by:
 Leonard C. Andersen, 1971–1973
 Scott Newhard, 1973–1979
 Andy McKean, 1979–1983
 Marv Diemer, 1983–1993
 William Witt, 1993–2003
 Dan Rasmussen, 2003–2009
 Gene Ficken, 2009–2011
 Dan Rasmussen, 2011–2013
 Mark Costello, 2013–2015
 David Sieck, 2015–present

References

023